Dongelberg is a village of Wallonia and a district of the municipality of Jodoigne, located in the province of Walloon Brabant, Belgium.

The name means dark mountain.

Dongelberg appears as Donglebert in a text dated 1079 and Dungelberge in the 12th century. It was an independent municipality until 1977, when it was placed within Jodoigne as part of the fusion of the Belgian municipalities.

People born in Dongelberg 
 Marc Wilmots (footballer)

Jodoigne
Former municipalities of Walloon Brabant